The Remington Model 511 Scoremaster  is a bolt-action rifle manufactured by Remington Arms from 1939 until 1963. The Model 511 has a  barrel, a one-piece hardwood stock, and a blued metal finish.

Variants
Model 511P
The Model 511P had the same specs as the standard model but with a patridge-type blade front sight and a "point-crometer" peep rear sight.
Model 511SB
The Model 511SB was the SmoothBore model (Garden Gun) with open sights.
Model 511X
The Model 511X featured improved sights and was produced from 1965 until 1966.

References

Bolt-action rifles of the United States
Remington Arms firearms
.22 LR rifles